Vitaliy Viktorovych Tymofiyenko (born 4 January 1993) is a Ukrainian professional football midfielder who plays for Canadian Soccer League club FC Continentals.

Career

Ukraine 
Tymofiyenko was the product of the youth systems of FC Metalurh Donetsk. He ultimately joined the senior team and made his debut on May 26, 2013, entering as a second-half substitute against FC Shakhtar Donetsk in the Ukrainian Premier League. He had limited match-time opportunities as he only played in 2 games throughout his two-year stint. Metalurh loaned him out to FC Stal Alchevsk for the 2013-14 season in the Ukrainian First League. The Luhansk-based club signed Tymofiyenko on a permanent basis the following season. 

Hirnyk-Sport Horishni Plavni acquired Tymofiyenko for the 2015-16 season. He furthered his career in the second tier by returning to his home province to play with FC Avanhard Kramatorsk. His first professional goal was recorded with Avanhard in a match against FC Naftovyk Okhtyrka on November 9, 2016. In 2017, he secured a contract with FC Cherkashchyna. The organization experienced financial troubles the following year which resulted in the club being renamed and relegated to the Ukrainian Second League. The club rebounded the next season as it secured promotion to the second tier.  

Tymofiyenko would remain in the third tier in 2019 by signing with Veres Rivne. After only 3 matches with Veres, he was released from his contract. Veres secured promotion to the second tier which resulted in the recruitment of Tymofiyenko for the 2020-21 season. In his sophomore season with the western Ukrainian club, he aided in securing promotion to the top tier by winning the league title.   

His return to the premier league was short-lived as he played in only 12 matches and mutually terminated his contract with the club. Peremoha Dnipro secured the services of Tymofiyenko for the remainder of the season.

Canada  
In the summer of 2022, he played abroad in southern Ontario in the Canadian Soccer League with FC Continentals. Throughout the season he helped the club secure a postseason berth by finishing fourth in the standings. He featured in the CSL Championship final where Continentals defeated Scarborough SC for the title.

References

External links
 
 

1993 births
Living people
Ukrainian footballers
FC Metalurh Donetsk players
FC Stal Alchevsk players
Ukrainian Premier League players
Ukrainian First League players
Ukrainian Second League players
FC Hirnyk-Sport Horishni Plavni players
FC Kramatorsk players
FC Cherkashchyna players
NK Veres Rivne players
FC Peremoha Dnipro players 
FC Continentals players
People from Sloviansk
Association football midfielders
Sportspeople from Donetsk Oblast
Canadian Soccer League (1998–present) players